Getulia institella is a species of snout moth. It was described by Ragonot in 1888. It is found in South Africa and Gambia.

References

Moths described in 1888
Phycitinae
Taxa named by Émile Louis Ragonot